Nirmala UI is an Indic scripts typeface created by Tiro Typeworks and commissioned by Microsoft. It was first released with Windows 8 in 2012 as a UI font and currently supports languages using Bengali–Assamese, Devanagari, Kannada, Gujarati, Gurmukhi, Malayalam, Meitei, Odia, Ol Chiki, Sinhala, Sora Sompeng, Tamil and Telugu. It also has support for Latin, with glyphs matching Segoe UI. It is also packaged with Microsoft Office 2013 and later versions of Windows. It has 3 weights : Regular, Bold and SemiLight.

The typeface was art-directed by Fiona Ross, produced by John Hudson, hinted by Ross Mills. Fiona Ross and John Hudson also designed the Devanagari and Odia, David Březina designed the Gujarati, Valentin Brustaux the Telugu, Jo De Baerdemaeker the Bengali and Fernando de Mello Vargas the Malayalam and Tamil. The Latin from Segoe UI is by Steve Matteson.

References 

Microsoft typefaces
Sans-serif typefaces
Typefaces and fonts introduced in 2012
Typefaces designed by John Hudson
Brahmic typefaces
Devanagari typefaces